Cornicularia is a genus of lichenised ascomycetes in the large family Parmeliaceae. It is a monotypic genus, with a single currently accepted species, the saxicolous lichen Cornicularia normoerica.  This species has an erect caespitose growth form, and is sometimes referred to as the brittle lichen.

Taxonomy
Cornicularia was originally proposed as a section of the genus Lichen by Johann Christian Daniel von Schreber in 1791. Erik Acharius promoted it to generic status in 1803.

References

External links
Cornicularia normoerica at the Stridvall's Botanical Site
Cornicularia normoerica at Sharnoff Photos

Parmeliaceae
Lichen genera
Monotypic Lecanorales genera
Taxa described in 1791
Taxa named by Johann Christian Daniel von Schreber